Klaus Klundt (born 25 December 1941) is a German chess International Master (1988), German Chess Championship medalist (1969, 1970), World Senior Chess Championship medalist (2004).

Biography
Klaus Klundt was multiple participant in final of the West German Chess Championship where he won two medals: silver (1970) and bronze (1969).

Klaus Klundt played for West Germany in the World Student Team Chess Championships:
 In 1968, at first reserve board in the 15th World Student Team Chess Championship in Ybbs (+4, =2, -2) and won team silver medal.

Klaus Klundt played for West Germany in the Chess Olympiads:
 In 1970, at second reserve board in the 19th Chess Olympiad in Siegen (+4, =2, -2).

Klaus Klundt played for West Germany in the Clare Benedict Cup:
 In 1971, at third board in the 18th Clare Benedict Chess Cup in Madrid (+1, =1, -2).

Klaus Klundt played for West Germany in the Nordic Chess Cups:
 In 1972, at third board in the 3rd Nordic Chess Cup in Großenbrode (+1, =1, -2) and won team bronze medal.

Klaus Klundt returned to active chess play in the second half of the 1980s, achieving successes on the international chess tournaments: shared 2nd place in Augsburg (1987/88), shared 2nd place in Würzburg (1989), ranked 3rd place in Linz (1995) and shared 1st place in Augsburg (1997). In 1988, he was awarded the FIDE International Master (IM) title.

In 2004, in Halle Klaus Klundt won silver medal in World Senior Chess Championship (S60 age group). In 2005, in Essen he won German Senior Chess Championship.

References

External links

Klaus Klundt chess games at 365chess.com

1941 births
Living people
People from Oleśnica County
German chess players
Chess International Masters
Chess Olympiad competitors